Also not to be confused with the 2019 Brexit-parody novella by the British novelist Ian McEwan CBE FRSL.  

Cockroach is a dark comedy book  by Canadian author Rawi Hage. It was released in 2008, published by Anansi. It is a teen/adult book for advanced literature.

Plot
A man, who is an immigrant from the Middle East, moves to the slums of Montreal, where he learns that he is stuck in poverty.  When he tries to take his own life, a "man in a speedo" saves him.  He is then sentenced to therapy, where he explains his horrid childhood and how he believes that he is a cockroach. He is also in love with a girl, Shohreh, and is friends/enemies with a man named Reza.  He gets a job at a restaurant, and can't help but stare at his boss' daughter.  He also steals from every rich man and poor woman.  Throughout the book the man starts to slowly change, for better and worse.

Reception
The novel was a shortlisted finalist for the 2008 Giller Prize, the 2008 Rogers Writers' Trust Fiction Prize and the 2008 Governor General's Award for English-language fiction.

It was selected for inclusion in the 2014 edition of CBC Radio's Canada Reads, where it was defended by Samantha Bee.

2008 Canadian novels
Novels by Rawi Hage
Novels set in Montreal